The London Maritime Arbitrators Association (LMAA) is an association of practising maritime and trade arbitrators with headquarters in London, UK.

Past presidents

 Malcolm T. Browne (1960–63)
 A.S. Bunker (1963–67)
 R.A.H. Clyde (1967–70)
 J. Chesterman (1970–73)
 Clifford A.L. Clark, M.C. (1973 - 75 & 1980 - 83)
 Cedric Barclay (1975–77)
 Ralph E. Kingsley (1977–78)
 Reginald O. Bishop (1978–79)
 Albert E. Morris, M.B.E. (1979–80)
 The Hon. Michael B. Summerskill (1983–85)
 Gerald Geddes (1985–87)
 Harold J. Miller (1987–89)
 Alec J. Kazantzis (1989–91)
 Bruce Harris (1991–93)
 Michael Ferryman (1993–95)
 Michael Baskerville (1995–97)
 Patrick O’Donovan (1997–99)
 Mark Hamsher (1999–2001)
 Christopher J.W. Moss (2001–03)
 Michael Baker-Harber (2003–06)
 Robert Gaisford (2006–08)
 John Tsatsas (2008 – 11)
 Christopher Fyans (2011–14)
 Clive Aston (2014–17)
 Ian Gaunt (2017–20)
 Bruce Harris (2020–21)

See also
London Court of International Arbitration
International Moot Competition on Maritime Arbitration

References

External links
Official site

Arbitration organizations
1960 establishments in England